FK Turon is an Uzbekistani football club based in Yaypan that currently plays in the Uzbekistan Pro League.

History

Domestic history

Current squad

Honours

Domestic
Uzbekistan Pro-B League
Champions (1): 2019

References

External links
teams.by
Soccerway profile

2007 establishments in Uzbekistan
Football clubs in Uzbekistan
Fergana Region